Fertin Pharma is a company based in Vejle, Denmark, and currently employs approximately 600 people. The company has facilities in both India and Canada. Fertin Pharma currently has about 800 employees.

In 2021, the capital fund EQT and the Bagger-Sørensen family sold the company to Philip Morris International for DKK 5.1 billion.

References

Pharmaceutical companies of Denmark
Pharmaceutical companies established in 2001
Danish companies established in 2001
Companies based in Vejle Municipality
Danish brands